Alan M. Emond  (born 1953) is a British paediatrician and professor emeritus in Child Health at Bristol Medical School at the University of Bristol. Emond is most notable for research into child and adolescent injury, epidemiology and health service evaluation as well as the Avon Longitudinal Study of Parents and Children.

Life
Emond studied philosophy and religious studies before graduating from Cambridge University in 1977.

Between 1982 and 1987, Emond attained the Doctor of Medicine with a thesis titled: The Spleen in Sickle Cell Disease in Childhood under Graham Serjeant at the University of the West Indies, Jamaica.

Career
In 2003, Emond established the Centre for Child and Adolescent Health, a joint academic centre between the University of Bristol and the University of the West of England to bring different disciplines together to promote child health.

Awards and honours
  In 2019 he was awarded the James Spence Medal, the highest honour given by the Royal College of Paediatrics and Child Health, for his extensive and wide-ranging research work.

Bibliography

References

Recipients of the James Spence Medal
1953 births
Living people
Academics of the University of Bristol
Fellows of the Higher Education Academy